The Tamanic languages are a small group of languages of Indonesian Borneo:
Embaloh (incl. Kalis)
Taman (Taman Dayak)
The Tamanic languages are not closely related to other languages on Borneo. Instead, they belong to the South Sulawesi languages, most probably in one branch together with Buginese.

West Kalimantan groups

Some Tamanic-speaking Dayak ethnic subgroups and their respective languages in West Kalimantan province, Indonesia:

{| class="wikitable"
! Group !! Language !! Regency
|-
| Kalis || Kalis || Kapuas Hulu
|-
| Lau' || Lau' || Kapuas Hulu
|-
| Tamambalo || Tamambalo || Kapuas Hulu
|-
| Taman || Taman || Kapuas Hulu
|}

References

South Sulawesi languages